Baughton is a hamlet in Worcestershire, England.

The Population of Baughton is 193. The population as a whole is older than the national average and the county average of Worcestershire.

Baughton was once home to Formula 1 legend Nigel Mansell. The village is a five-minute drive from Upton-Upon-Severn, famed for its numerous festivals like the Jazz Festival and about 20 minutes from the large town of Malvern, Worcestershire.

References

Villages in Worcestershire